Bafo Biyela (11 January 1981 – 17 September 2012) was a South African association football midfielder who last played for Thanda Royal Zulu.

References

1981 births
2012 deaths
People from Empangeni
Zulu people
South African soccer players
Association football midfielders
South Africa international soccer players
AmaZulu F.C. players
Lamontville Golden Arrows F.C. players